Franklyn Obunike Akammadu (born 11 August 1998) is an Italian football player who plays as a forward for A.C.D. Campodarsego.

Club career
He made his Serie B debut for Cesena on 18 May 2017 in a game against Verona. On 22 August 2018, Akammadu joined League Two side Tranmere Rovers on a season-long loan deal from Alessandria, however the deal was terminated part way through the season after Akammadu had been given limited opportunities. On 27 January 2020, he was released from his contract with Alessandria.

References

External links
 

1998 births
Sportspeople from Padua
Living people
Italian footballers
Italian expatriate footballers
ACF Fiorentina players
A.C. Cesena players
A.C. Prato players
Fermana F.C. players
Tranmere Rovers F.C. players
U.S. Alessandria Calcio 1912 players
Forlì F.C. players
A.C.D. Campodarsego players
Serie B players
Serie C players
Serie D players
Association football forwards
Italian expatriate sportspeople in England
Expatriate footballers in England
Footballers from Veneto                       
Italian people of Nigerian descent
21st-century Italian people